Calum Robert Kerr (born 5 April 1972) is a Scottish National Party politician who was the Member of Parliament for Berwickshire, Roxburgh and Selkirk from 2015 to 2017. During his tenure in Parliament, he was the SNP's Environment and Rural Affairs spokesperson in the House of Commons.

Early life
Kerr was born in Galashiels in the Scottish Borders. He attended Peebles High School where his father was the head teacher. Kerr read History at St Andrews University. Prior to politics, he worked in sales for IT companies; including Avaya.

Political career
The seat, and its predecessors Tweeddale, Ettrick and Lauderdale and Roxburgh, Selkirk and Peebles, had been held by the Scottish Liberal Democrats and the Scottish Liberal Party since 1965.

Kerr was elected in the May 2015 general election, unseating the Liberal Democrat incumbent Michael Moore and finishing just 328 votes ahead of John Lamont of the Conservative Party. He was the SNP's Environment and Rural Affairs spokesperson in the House of Commons.

He stood for re-election at the 2017 general election, but was defeated by Lamont, who won a majority of 11,060 votes; the largest Conservative majority gained in a Scottish seat at that election. He stood again in 2019 but was defeated, although he reduced the Conservative majority.

References

External links
 Calum Kerr MP personal website
 Profile on SNP website
 

1972 births
Alumni of the University of St Andrews
Avaya employees
Living people
Members of the Parliament of the United Kingdom for Scottish constituencies
People educated at Peebles High School, Peeblesshire
People from Galashiels
Scottish National Party MPs
UK MPs 2015–2017